Gordana Jurcan (born ) is a retired Croatian female volleyball player. She was a member of the Croatia women's national volleyball team. Jurcan was part of the Croatian national team at the 1993 Mediterranean Games in Languedoc-Roussillon, at the 1995 European Championship in the Netherlands, at the 1995 World Cup in Japan, and at the 2000 Summer Olympics in Sydney. With ŽOK Rijeka she won two Croatian Leagues, in 1999 and 2000, and four Croatian Cups, in 1992, 1999, 2000 and 2001.

Career
Jurcan was born in Pula, Croatia. She started playing at 12 with local club ŽOK Poreč. When she was still in the kadeti of her club, she started playing for the first team. Her talent was quickly noted, and several top teams tried to bring her to their club. She eventually chose Rijeka, and played there for the rest of her career. She was one of the fundamental players of Rijeka for many years, as well as the "captain in the real sense of the word."

With Rijeka she won the 1999 and 2000 Croatian Leagues, and the 1992, 1999, 2000, and 2001 Croatian Cups.

She played both for Yugoslavia and Croatia at a youth level. After the fall of Yugoslavia, she started playing for Croatia, and in 1992 became a standard player in the Croatian national team. With Croatia, she played at the 1993 Mediterranean Games, winning the gold medal. She won the silver medal at the 1995 European Championship in the Netherlands. In the same year, she also took part with Croatia in the 1995 World Cup, finishing fourth.

She competed with the national team at the 2000 Summer Olympics in Sydney, Australia, finishing 7th.

Jurcan retired in 2001. Five years later, she started training the youth academy of HAOK Rijeka.

Clubs
  ŽOK Poreč (1987–1988)
  ŽOK Rijeka (1988–2001)

Sporting achievements

Clubs

National championships
 1992/1993  Croatian Championship, with ŽOK Rijeka
 1993/1994  Croatian Championship, with ŽOK Rijeka
 1995/1996  Croatian Championship, with ŽOK Rijeka
 1996/1997  Croatian Championship, with ŽOK Rijeka
 1998/1999  Croatian Championship, with ŽOK Rijeka
 1999/2000  Croatian Championship, with ŽOK Rijeka

National cups
 1991/1992  Croatian Cup, with ŽOK Rijeka
 1992/1993  Croatian Cup, with ŽOK Rijeka
 1994  Croatian Cup, with ŽOK Rijeka
 1995  Croatian Cup, with ŽOK Rijeka
 1996  Croatian Cup, with ŽOK Rijeka
 1997  Croatian Cup, with ŽOK Rijeka
 1999  Croatian Cup, with ŽOK Rijeka
 2000  Croatian Cup, with ŽOK Rijeka
 2001  Croatian Cup, with ŽOK Rijeka

National team
 1993  Mediterranean Games
 1995  CEV European Championship
 1995  FIVB World Cup

See also
 Croatia at the 2000 Summer Olympics

References

External links
 
 http://www.cev.lu/Competition-Area/PlayerDetails.aspx?TeamID=1202&PlayerID=19915&ID=73
http://www.glasistre.hr/multimedija/sport/istra-ni-na-olimpijskim-igrama-2-2-parlov-i-jerkov---zlatna-veza-pule-i-splita-357024
http://porestina.info/u-sklopu-proslave-60-godina-odbojke-u-poreu-odigran-enski-turnir-susret-generacija/

1971 births
Living people
Croatian women's volleyball players
Volleyball players at the 2000 Summer Olympics
Olympic volleyball players of Croatia
Sportspeople from Pula